The 3rd New York Infantry Regiment was an infantry regiment that served in the Union Army during the American Civil War. It is also known as the Albany Regiment.  They wore an americanized zouave uniform which consisted of a dark blue zouave jacket with red trimming, dark blue pantaloons, white gaiters, red fez with a blue tazzle, and a dark blue zouave vest with a red trimming.

Service

On July 30, 1861, it was ordered to Baltimore and quartered at Fort McHenry until April 1, 1862. The Summer of 1862 was spent at Suffolk and on September 12, 1862, it was again ordered to Fort Monore. The original members not reenlisted were mustered out in May 1863, but the regiment remained in the field composed of 162 recruits, 200 veterans.

The Third was present during the siege of Suffolk, after which it was ordered to Folly Island, where it took an active part in the operations against Fort Wagner, the bombardment of Fort Sumter and attacks on Charleston in the summer and autumn of 1863, as part of Alford's brigade of the 18th Corps. In October 1863, it was returned to Virginia, where it was active in the advance under General Butler in May 1864, losing 5 killed, 50 wounded and 7 missing.

It fought in the battle of Drewy's Buff and was then transferred to the 3rd Brigade, 3rd Division, 18th Corps, which moved to Cold Harbor, where it was active until June 12, 1864, at which time it was transferred to Bermuda Hundred. The regiment rejoined the 10th Corps on June 15, 1864, and formed part of the 1st Brigade, 2nd division, with which it was engaged in the assaults at Petersburg in June, the mine explosion of July 30, Fort Harrison and the Darbytown Road.

On December 3, 1864, the Third was attached to the 1st Brigade, 2nd Division, 24th Corps and sent to North Carolina where it was engaged at Fort Fisher, Sugar Loaf Battery, Fort Anderson and Wilmington. It remained in North Carolina performing picket and garrison duty until General Sherman's arrival and the close of the war.

It was mustered out of the service at Raleigh on August 28, 1865.

Casualties
The regiment suffered 37 deaths from wounds and 85 from other causes, for a total of 122 fatalities. Of these, one officer was killed in combat while 2 more died from disease or accident. Thirty Six enlisted men were killed while 83 died from disease or accident.

Commanders
Colonel Frederick Townsend
Colonel Samuel M. Alford
Colonel Eldridge G. Floyd
Colonel John Elmer Mulford

See also
List of New York Civil War regiments

References

External links
New York State Military Museum and Veterans Research Center - Civil War - 3rd Infantry Regiment History, photographs, table of battles and casualties, Civil War newspaper clippings, historical sketch, and battle flag for the 3rd New York Infantry Regiment.
"In Search of my Son" Stillmna Wightman account of recovering the body of his son Sgt Major Edward Wightman of the 3rd New York Infantry killed at the Battle of Ft Fisher January 1865
Sgt Major Edward King Wightman at Find a grave

Reference list
 1 The Union Army, Vol.2, Page 51

Infantry 003
1861 establishments in New York (state)
Military units and formations established in 1861
Military units and formations disestablished in 1863